Route 781, or Highway 781, may refer to:

Canada
 Alberta Highway 781
Saskatchewan Highway 781

Israel
 Route 781 (Israel)

United Kingdom
 A781 road

United States